Archaeological sites are distributed throughout all regions of Chile.

Caleta Wulaia
Guarelo Island
Juan Fernández Islands
Los Lagos
Mulchén
Port Famine
Purén
San Pedro de Atacama

References

 
Archaeological sites
Chile